Aka Nanitashvili is a Georgian fashion designer based in Tbilisi.

Aka was born in Tbilisi, Georgia in 1978. She graduated from Tbilisi State Academy of Arts in 2000.

She founded her first boutique "Capriccio" in 2001. Afterwards, she extended her business and launched "K Studio" in partnership with a couple of other designers in 2006. At present she runs her own fashion house.

References

1978 births
Businesspeople from Tbilisi
Living people
Fashion designers from Georgia (country)
Tbilisi State Academy of Arts alumni